"Everything" is a song by American singer Mary J. Blige. It was written and produced by Jimmy Jam & Terry Lewis for Blige's third album, Share My World (1997). The song contains samples from "You Are Everything" (1971) by American soul group The Stylistics and "The Payback" (1973) by American singer James Brown, also incorporating elements from "Sukiyaki" (1961) by Japanese singer Kyu Sakamoto. Due to the inclusion of the samples,  Brown, Hachidai Nakamura, Rokusuke Ei, Linda Creed, Thom Bell, John Starks, and Fred Wesley are also credited as songwriters.

MCA Records released the song as the third single from Share My World in August 1997. "Everything" reached number twenty-four on the US Billboard Hot 100 and number five on the US Hot R&B/Hip-Hop Songs. It also peaked at number six on the UK Singles Chart, becoming Blige's first top ten hit in the UK, and entered the top ten in the Netherlands and the top twenty in New Zealand. An accompanying music video, directed by Hype Williams, was filmed in Kauai, Hawaii in June 1997.

Critical reception
Larry Flick from Billboard stated in his review of "Everything", that Blige "is in typically solid diva form on this romantic jeep cruiser, which is fueled by a prominent sample of "You Are Everything" by the Stylistics, as well as a snippet from James Brown's "The Payback"." He noted that producers Jam and Lewis "do an exemplary job of letting Blige breathe freely as an artist (which she does with delicious soul), while also injecting their own signature pop/R&B flavor." Jonathan Bernstein from Entertainment Weekly felt that "she unleashes equal joy" on the song. Alan Jones from Music Week declared it as a "wonderful Jam & Lewis creation" and "a spartan urban contemporary track, which provides emphatic proof of Blige's singing ability." Ralph Tee from the magazine's RM Dance Update concluded, "For me this is the standout song from Share My World, the familiarity factor in the music and Mary's best vocal yet having a lot to do with it." Gerald Martinez from New Sunday Times opined that Blige "mixes sweetness and power". Laura Jamison from Salon also noted that "Everything" quotes Stylistics' song, adding that it "draws you in with its sheer familiarity."

Music video
The accompanying music video for the song was directed by American director Hype Williams and shot in Kauai, Hawaii in June 1997. The video blends South Asian style against the lush jungles, cliffs and black sand beaches of the island.

Track listings

Credits and personnel
Credits are adapted from the Share My World liner notes.

 Thom Bell – writer (sample)
 Mary J. Blige – executive producer, vocals
 James Brown – writer (sample)
 Linda Creed – writer (sample)
 Rokusuke Ei – writer (sample)
 James Harris III – producer, writer
 Terry Lewis – producer, writer
 Hachidai Nakamura – writer (sample)
 John Starks – writer (sample)
 Steve Stoute – producer
 Fred Wesley – writer (sample)

Elbernita "Twinkie" Clark- writer (sample)

Charts

Weekly charts

Year-end charts

Certifications

Release history

References

1997 singles
1997 songs
Mary J. Blige songs
MCA Records singles
Music videos directed by Hype Williams
Song recordings produced by Jimmy Jam and Terry Lewis
Songs with music by Hachidai Nakamura
Songs written by Fred Wesley
Songs written by James Brown
Songs written by Jimmy Jam and Terry Lewis
Songs written by John "Jabo" Starks
Songs written by Linda Creed
Songs written by Thom Bell